is a professional Japanese baseball player. He is a infielder for the Hokkaido Nippon-Ham Fighters of Nippon Professional Baseball (NPB).

References 

1996 births
Living people
Baseball people from Saga Prefecture
Nippon Professional Baseball infielders
Saitama Seibu Lions players
Hokkaido Nippon-Ham Fighters players